The Queen's Award for Enterprise: Innovation (Technology) (2002) was awarded on 21 April 2002, by Queen Elizabeth II.

Recipients
The following organisations were awarded this year.
Architectural Plants of Horsham, West Sussex for ‘Architectural Plants’ range of garden plants.
BAE Systems Avionics Limited, Avionic Systems of Rochester, Kent for Helmet systems for aircrew.
Vacuum and Exhaust Management Division, BOC Edwards, part of The BOC Group plc of Crawley, West Sussex for High performance vacuum pump for the semiconductor manufacturing industry.
Beardow & Adams (Adhesives) Limited of Milton Keynes for BAMFutura - advanced hot melt adhesive technology.
BioInteractions Ltd of Reading, Berkshire for ‘Trillium Biopassive Surface’ (Trademark of Medtronic Inc) - non-thrombogenic and antithrombogenic polymer coating.
Cambridge Neurotechnology Ltd of Papworth Everard, Cambridge for ‘Actiwatch activity monitoring system’.
Cintec International Ltd of Newport, for ‘Archtec’ method of masonry bridge reinforcement.
ClinPhone Group Limited of Nottingham for Electronic trial management solutions - telephone and web-based services for managing global clinical trials.
ColorMatrix Europe Ltd of Knowsley, Merseyside for Acetaldehyde reducer (additive).
Cooper Cameron (UK) Limited (Oil-Tool Branch) of Leeds for Offshore wellhead pressure control equipment - ‘SpoolTree’.
Elekta Oncology Systems Ltd of Crawley, West Sussex for Patient support system for radiotherapy treatment.
Elementis Chromium of Stockton-on-Tees for CA21 Chromic acid.
EuroDirect Database Marketing Limited of Bradford for Transforming raw data into valuable marketing intelligence.
Eurotalk Ltd of London SW6 for Design and production of ‘Talk Now!’ Language Learning software.
Flexipol Packaging Ltd of Haslingden, Lancashire for ‘Ripp’n’Flow’ sack - reduction of foreign body contamination in the food industry.
Formpave Limited of Coleford, Gloucestershire for ‘Formpave’ stormwater source control system.
Fujifilm Electronic Imaging Ltd of Hemel Hempstead, for Hertfordshire Multibeam laser imaging on Luxel F-9000.
Garnett Farms Engineering Ltd of Knutsford, Cheshire for AG Dispenser - range of machinery for animal bedding cubicles and poultry houses.
Gifford and Partners of Southampton for ‘Archtec’ method of masonry bridge reinforcement.
HoldFast Level Crossings Limited of Cheltenham, Gloucestershire for ‘HoldFast’ level crossing system.
Holset Engineering Company Limited of Huddersfield for Variable geometry turbocharger.
domnick hunter limited of Gateshead for ‘Maxigas’ - generators for on-site production of industrial nitrogen gas.
McConnel Limited of Ludlow, Shropshire for ‘McConnel EasyDrive’ system for verge mowing.
Norfolk Frames Ltd of Marsham, Norfolk for Doors with unique glass fibre design.
Pama & Co Ltd of Manchester for ‘Plug n Go’ mobile phone portable car kit.
Paradise Datacom Limited of Witham, Essex for Design of custom ASIC (Application Specific Integrated Circuit).
Penlon Limited of Abingdon, Oxfordshire for Delta anaesthetic vaporiser.
Point Source Ltd of Southampton for ‘iFLEX 1000’ - temperature controlled fibre coupled laser.
R D Trading Ltd t/a RDC of Witham, Essex for End of life computer asset management.
Rockfield Software Limited of Swansea, Wales for ELFEN discrete element numerical analysis software for the ‘Archtec’ reinforcement system.
SYR Limited t/a Syr Clean.com of Stourbridge, West Midlands for Integrated floor mopping system.
Shackerley (Holdings) Group Limited of Chorley, Lancashire for Glass block wall construction and timber dry fit construction system.
Sophos PLC of Abingdon, Oxfordshire for Anti-virus software.
Toolroom Technology Limited (TTL) of Aylesbury, Buckinghamshire for Adaptive machining for the gas turbine industry.
Valiant Technology Ltd of London SW12 for ‘Roamer’ the educational robot.
Variable Message Signs Limited of Gateshead for ‘Rigel’ LED technology for enhanced optical performance of variable message signs.
Andrew Wilkes & Associates Limited of Lymington, Hampshire for Telecom site design and planning.

References

Queen's Award for Enterprise: Innovation (Technology)
2002 in the United Kingdom